Jennifer Armour (born August 27, 1985, in Minneapolis, Minnesota) is an American actress and voice artist. She is known for starring in Ghoul directed by Petr Jákl. In 2022, she began playing Wendy Blissett in the long-running British soap opera Hollyoaks.

Filmography

Video games
Horizon Forbidden West, Dead Island 2, Battlefield 2042 , Gears Tactics, Battlefield V, Lego The Incredibles, Alien: Isolation, Star Wars Battlefront II, Control, Mirror's Edge Catalyst, Guitar Hero Live, Hidden Agenda, Homefront: The Revolution, Soma, Pillars of Eternity II: Deadfire, SpellForce 3, The Crew.

References

External links

1985 births
Living people
American actresses
21st-century American women